France is divided into 577 constituencies (circonscriptions) for the election of deputies to the lower legislative House, the National Assembly (539 in Metropolitan France, 27 in the overseas departments and territories, and 11 for French residents overseas). Deputies are elected in a two-round system to a term fixed to a maximum of five years. The department of Pas-de-Calais has 12 Members of Parliament.

History 

The department of Pas-de-Calais, in 1986 was divided into 14 legislative districts.

List

Current

Defunct

References

Legislative_constituencies_of_the_Pas-de-Calais_department
Pas-de-Calais